Kūris is the masculine form of a Lithuanian family name. Its feminine forms  are: Kūrienė (married woman or widow) and Kūrytė (unmarried woman).

The surname may refer to:

Egidijus Kūris (born 1961), former President of the Constitutional Court of the Republic of Lithuania
Pranas Kūris (born 1938), Lithuanian Judge of the European Court of Justice

See also
Kuris (disambiguation)

Lithuanian-language surnames